Daniel Ronald Louis Hill (born 1 October 1974) is an English former footballer who played as a midfielder. He made 90 appearances in the Premier League and Football League playing for Tottenham Hotspur, Birmingham City, Watford, Cardiff City and Oxford United, as well as playing non-league football for teams including Dagenham & Redbridge, Hornchurch, Heybridge Swifts and Leyton. He represented England at youth and under-21 level.

At Tottenham he put in a memorable performance as his side played rivals Arsenal at Highbury on the last day of the 1992–93 Premier League season; Hill had a hand in all three goals as Tottenham won 3–1.

References

1974 births
Living people
People from Enfield, London
English footballers
Association football midfielders
England youth international footballers
England under-21 international footballers
Tottenham Hotspur F.C. players
Birmingham City F.C. players
Watford F.C. players
Cardiff City F.C. players
Oxford United F.C. players
Dagenham & Redbridge F.C. players
Hornchurch F.C. players
Heybridge Swifts F.C. players
Leyton F.C. players
Premier League players
English Football League players
National League (English football) players